Yana Vastavel (born 22 October 1999) is a Belgian female acrobatic gymnast. Along with her partner, Solano Cassamajor, she finished 4th in the 2014 Acrobatic Gymnastics World Championships.

References

External links

 

1999 births
Living people
Belgian acrobatic gymnasts
Female acrobatic gymnasts
Belgian sportswomen
Gymnasts at the 2015 European Games
European Games medalists in gymnastics
European Games silver medalists for Belgium
Sportspeople from Mechelen